This page details Toronto FC records from their inaugural season in 2007 as a member of Major League Soccer. It includes player records, attendances and competition information. All records listed are from competitive matches only, unless otherwise stated.

Honours
Source:

Other honours
MLS Cup
Runners-up (2): 2016, 2019

Supporters' Shield
Runners-up: 2020

CONCACAF Champions League
Runners-up: 2018
Semi-finals: 2011–12

Campeones Cup
Runners-up: 2018

Canadian Championship
Runners-up (5): 2008, 2014, 2019, 2021, 2022

Eastern Conference (Regular Season)
Runners-up: 2020
Third place: 2016

Carolina Challenge Cup
Runners-up (2): 2007, 2009
Third place: 2010

Walt Disney World Pro Soccer Classic
Runners-up (2): 2010, 2012

Texas Pro Soccer Festival
Third place: 2008

Individual records

Appearances

 Youngest player –  Jahkeele Marshall-Rutty, 16 years 4 months 8 days (at Philadelphia Union, MLS, October 24, 2020)
 Youngest starter –  Fuad Ibrahim, 16 years 11 months 3 days (v. San Jose Earthquakes, MLS, July 19, 2008)
 Oldest player –  Rick Titus, 39 years 5 months 27 days (v. Chivas USA, MLS, September 6, 2008)
 Most consecutive appearances –  Chad Barrett, 39 (August 3, 2008 – August 4, 2009)

Bold indicates player still active with club.

Goalscorers
 Most goals in a season (all competitions) –  Sebastian Giovinco, 23 (2015) (22 in MLS)
 Most goals in a game –  Dwayne De Rosario, 3 (at Montreal Impact, Canadian Championship, June 18, 2009);  Sebastian Giovinco, 3 (at New York City FC, MLS, July 12, 2015; v. Orlando City SC, MLS, August 5, 2015; v. D.C. United, MLS, July 23, 2016; v. New England Revolution, MLS, August 6, 2016 and at New York City FC, MLS Playoffs, November 6, 2016);  Justin Morrow, 3 (v. New York Red Bulls, MLS, September 30, 2017);  Jozy Altidore, 3 (v. Vancouver Whitecaps FC, Canadian Championship, August 14, 2018) and  Ayo Akinola, 3 (v. Montreal Impact, MLS is Back Tournament, July 16, 2020)
 Fastest goal –  Tsubasa Endoh, 29 seconds (v. Atlanta United FC, MLS, June 26, 2019)
 Youngest scorer –  Fuad Ibrahim, 16 years 10 months 27 days (at Chicago Fire, MLS, July 12, 2008)
 Oldest scorer –  Benoît Cheyrou, 36 years 0 months 20 days (at Ottawa Fury, Canadian Championship, May 23, 2017)
 Most consecutive MLS games with a goal – 5,  Dwayne De Rosario (April 10 – May 1, 2010) and  Danny Koevermans (June 20 – July 4, 2012)

Bold indicates player still active with club.

Debut goals
  Jarrod Smith (at LA Galaxy, MLS, April 13, 2008)
  Julius James (v. LA Galaxy, MLS, May 31, 2008)
  Abdus Ibrahim (at Chicago Fire, MLS, July 12, 2008)
  Ali Gerba (at Columbus Crew, MLS, July 25, 2009)
  Peri Marosevic (at Portland Timbers, MLS, July 30, 2011)
  Luis Silva (v. LA Galaxy, CONCACAF Champions League, March 7, 2012)
  Justin Braun (v. FC Dallas, MLS, April 6, 2013)
  Jermain Defoe (at Seattle Sounders FC, MLS, March 15, 2014)
  Jozy Altidore (at Vancouver Whitecaps FC, MLS, March 7, 2015)
  Robbie Findley (at Vancouver Whitecaps FC, MLS, March 7, 2015)
  Lucas Janson (at San Jose Earthquakes, MLS, August 18, 2018)
  Nick DeLeon (at Philadelphia Union, MLS, March 2, 2019)
  Alejandro Pozuelo (v. New York City FC, MLS, March 29, 2019)
  Ifunanyachi Achara (v. New York City FC, MLS, March 7, 2020)
  Federico Bernardeschi (v. Charlotte FC, MLS, July 23, 2022)

Shutouts
 Most shutouts in a season –  Alex Bono – 13, 2017 (10 in MLS)
 Minutes without conceding – 476 minutes –  Stefan Frei (386 min.) and  Jon Conway (90 min.) (May 8, 2010 – May 29, 2010)

Club records

Wins and points
 Biggest MLS home win – 5–0 (v. Orlando City, August 22, 2015 and v. Columbus Crew, May 26, 2017)
 Biggest MLS away win – 4–0 (at LA Galaxy, September 16, 2017); 5–1 (at FC Cincinnati, September 7, 2019)
 Biggest Canadian Championship home win – 4–0 (v. Ottawa Fury, May 31, 2017, v. York United, September 22, 2021 and v. CF Montréal, June 22, 2022)
 Biggest Canadian Championship away win – 6–1 (at Montreal Impact, June 18, 2009)
 Biggest MLS Playoffs home win – 5–1 (v. D.C. United, October 19, 2019)
 Biggest MLS Playoffs away win – 5–0 (at New York City FC, November 6, 2016)
 Biggest CONCACAF Champions League home win – 5–1 (v. Águila, August 1, 2012)
 Biggest CONCACAF Champions League away win – 3–0 (at FC Dallas, October 18, 2011 and at Águila, September 25, 2012)
 Most wins in a season – 25 in 43 games, 2017 (20 in 34 MLS games)
 Fewest MLS wins in a season – 5 in 34 games, 2012
 Most points – 69 in 34 games, 2017
 Fewest points – 23 in 34 games, 2012

Losses
 Biggest MLS home loss – 2–6 (v. Philadelphia Union, May 28, 2011)
 Biggest MLS away loss – 1–7 (at D.C. United, July 3, 2021)
 Biggest Canadian Championship home loss – 0–1 (v. Vancouver Whitecaps, July 1, 2008)
 Biggest Canadian Championship away loss – 0–6 (at Montreal Impact, May 1, 2013)
 Biggest MLS Playoffs home loss – 0–1 (v. New York Red Bulls, November 5, 2017 and v. Nashville SC, November 24, 2020)
 Biggest MLS Playoffs away loss – 0–3 (at Montreal Impact, October 29, 2015)
 Biggest CONCACAF Champions League home loss – 1–3 (v. Santos Laguna, August 28, 2012 and v. Cruz Azul, April 27, 2021)
 Biggest CONCACAF Champions League away loss – 0–4 (at UNAM, September 14, 2011 and at Independiente, February 19, 2019); 2–6 (at Santos Laguna, April 4, 2012)
 Most MLS losses in a season – 21 in 34 games, 2012
 Fewest losses in a season – 7 in 43 games, 2017 (5 in 34 MLS games)

Draws
 Highest scoring home draw – 4–4 (v. D.C. United, MLS, June 13, 2018)
 Highest scoring away draw – 4–4 (at New York City FC, MLS, July 12, 2015)
 Most draws in a season – 17 in 46 games, 2011
 Most MLS draws in a season – 15 in 34 games, 2011 and 2014
 Fewest MLS draws in a season – 5 in 23 games, 2020

Goals
 Most goals scored in a game – 6 (at Montreal Impact, Canadian Championship, June 18, 2009)
 Most goals scored in an MLS game – 5 (v. Orlando City, August 22, 2015, v. Columbus Crew, May 26, 2017, v. LA Galaxy, September 15, 2018 and at FC Cincinnati, September 7, 2019)
 Most goals scored in an MLS Playoff game – 5 (at New York City FC, November 6, 2016, v. Montreal Impact, November 30, 2016 and v. D.C. United, October 19, 2019)
 Most goals scored in a CONCACAF Champions League game – 5 (v. Águila, August 1, 2012)
 Most goals scored in a season – 87 in 43 games, 2017 (74 in 34 MLS games)
 Fewest goals scored in a season – 25 in 30 games, 2007

Goals conceded
 Most shutouts in a season – 17 in 43 games, 2017 (13 in 34 MLS games)
 Most goals conceded in a game – 7 (at D.C. United, July 3, 2021)
 Most goals conceded in a season – 80 in 47 games, 2018
 Most MLS goals conceded in a season – 66 in 34 games, 2021 and 2022
 Fewest goals conceded in a season – 43 in 43 games, 2017 (37 in 34 MLS games)

Firsts
Pre-season friendlies from 2007 only counted if 90 minutes against professional opposition.

 First game – v. Houston Dynamo, Carolina Challenge Cup, March 25, 2007 (0–2)
 First win – v. New York Red Bulls, Carolina Challenge Cup, March 28, 2007 (2–1)
 First goal –  Alecko Eskandarian (v. New York Red Bulls, Carolina Challenge Cup, March 28, 2007)

MLS firsts
 First game – at Chivas USA, April 7, 2007 (0–2)
 First home game – v. Kansas City Wizards, April 28, 2007 (0–1)
 First win – v. Chicago Fire, May 12, 2007 (3–1)
 First away draw – at Columbus Crew, May 26, 2007 (2–2)
 First away win – at Real Salt Lake, July 4, 2007 (2–1)
 First shutout –  Greg Sutton (v. Houston Dynamo, May 16, 2007)
 First away shutout –  Srdjan Djekanović (at Houston Dynamo, July 15, 2007)

MLS Playoffs firsts
 First playoff game – at Montreal Impact, October 29, 2015 (0–3)
 First playoff home game and first playoff win – v. Philadelphia Union, October 26, 2016 (3–1)
 First playoff draw – v. Seattle Sounders, December 10, 2016 (0–0)
 First playoff away win – at New York City FC, November 6, 2016 (5–0)

MLS goals
 First goal –  Danny Dichio (1–0, v. Chicago Fire, May 12, 2007)
 First 'game-winning goal' –  Kevin Goldthwaite (2–1, v. Chicago Fire, May 12, 2007)
 First away goal –  Danny Dichio (1–1, at Columbus Crew, May 26, 2007)
 First 'game-tying goal' –  Jim Brennan (2–2, at Columbus Crew, May 26, 2007)
 First away 'game-winning goal' –  Collin Samuel (2–1, at Real Salt Lake, July 4, 2007)

MLS Playoffs goals
 First playoff goal –  Sebastian Giovinco (1–0, v. Philadelphia Union, October 26, 2016)
 First playoff 'game-winning goal' –  Jonathan Osorio (2–0, v. Philadelphia Union, October 26, 2016)
 First playoff away goal –  Sebastian Giovinco (1–0, at New York City FC, November 6, 2016)
 First playoff 'game-tying goal' –  Armando Cooper (1–1, v. Montreal Impact, November 30, 2016)

Multiple goals
 First brace –  Amado Guevara (v. Kansas City Wizards, MLS, April 28, 2008)
 First hat-trick –  Dwayne De Rosario (at Montreal Impact, Canadian Championship, June 18, 2009)
 First MLS hat-trick –  Sebastian Giovinco (at New York City FC, July 12, 2015)
 First MLS Playoffs hat-trick –  Sebastian Giovinco (at New York City FC, November 6, 2016)

Sequences
 Wins – 6 (April 21, 2017 – May 19, 2017 and August 12, 2017 – September 20, 2017)
 Draws – 4 (June 2, 2010 – July 1, 2010)
 Losses – 9 (March 17, 2012 – May 19, 2012)
 Games unbeaten – 11 (July 5, 2017 – September 20, 2017)
 MLS games unbeaten – 18 (August 11, 2019 – September 1, 2020)
 Games winless  – 13 (July 11, 2012 – October 6, 2012)
 Shutouts – 4 (May 12, 2010 – May 22, 2010)
 MLS shutouts – 4 (July 21, 2020 – August 28, 2020)

At home 
 Home wins – 7 (April 21, 2017 – June 23, 2017)
 Home games unbeaten – 18 (August 15, 2009 – August 17, 2010)
 Home MLS games unbeaten – 15 (October 23, 2016 – September 9, 2017)
 Home games unbeaten in a single season – 16 (March 31, 2017 – September 9, 2017)
 Home MLS games unbeaten in a single season – 14 (March 31, 2017 – September 9, 2017)

Attendance 
All attendance at home unless otherwise specified.

 Highest attendance – 47,658 (v. LA Galaxy at Rogers Centre, CONCACAF Champions League, March 7, 2012)
 Lowest attendance – 500 (v. FC Dallas, CONCACAF Champions League, August 25, 2011)
 Highest MLS attendance – 36,045 (v. Seattle Sounders FC, MLS Cup, December 10, 2016)
 Lowest MLS attendance – 16,313 (v. D.C. United, April 16, 2011)

Other competitions
 Highest Canadian Championship attendance – 26,539 (v. Montreal Impact, June 27, 2017)
 Lowest Canadian Championship attendance – 3,651 (v. York United, September 22, 2021)
 Highest friendly attendance – 22,089 (v. Real Madrid, August 7, 2009)
 Lowest friendly attendance – 18,097 (v. Pachuca, July 5, 2008)

Not involving Toronto FC
 Highest attendance at BMO Field – 29,122 (Canada v. Jamaica, March 27, 2022)
 Highest MLS attendance at BMO Field – 21,700 (FC Dallas v. Colorado Rapids, MLS Cup 2010, November 21, 2010)
 Highest non-soccer attendance at BMO Field (as Exhibition Stadium) – 40,148 (NHL Centennial Classic, January 1, 2017)

Average attendance

MLS records

 Joint-fourth most regular season points – 69 (2017)
Most free kick goals by a single player –  Sebastian Giovinco, 14
Most free kick goals by a single player in an MLS season –  Sebastian Giovinco, 6 (2017)
 Longest scoreless sequence – 824 minutes (July 7, 2007 – September 22, 2007)
 Most away fans at a regular season game – approx. 4,200 (at Montreal Impact, March 16, 2013)
 Coldest game involving MLS teams –  (at Colorado Rapids, CONCACAF Champions League, February 20, 2018)

Milestones
 First club from outside the United States in MLS (2007), to reach MLS Cup (2016), and to win the Supporters' Shield and MLS Cup (2017)
 First club to win a domestic treble (2017)
 First Liechtensteiner – Nicolas Hasler (at D.C. United, August 5, 2017)
 Last game at Giants Stadium (at New York Red Bulls, MLS, October 24, 2009)

Canadian Championship records
 Biggest win and most goals in a game – 6–1 (at Montreal Impact, June 18, 2009); 5–2 (v. Vancouver Whitecaps FC, August 15, 2018)
 First goal ( Marco Vélez), clean sheet ( Greg Sutton), and win – 1–0 (at Montreal Impact in the first ever game at Saputo Stadium, May 27, 2008)
 First hat-trick –  Dwayne De Rosario (at Montreal Impact, June 18, 2009)

International competitions

Record by country

Record by club

By season

Awards

 Player of the Month –  Sebastian Giovinco (July and August, 2015) and  Alejandro Pozuelo (September, 2020)
 Player of the Week –  Amado Guevara (Week 10, 2009),  Chad Barrett (Week 17, 2009),  Dwayne De Rosario (Weeks 5 and 10, 2010),  Joao Plata (Week 8, 2011),  Danny Koevermans (Week 27, 2011),  Robert Earnshaw (Week 2, 2013),  Jozy Altidore (Week 1, 2015; Week 27, 2017),  Sebastian Giovinco (Weeks 13, 14 and 19, 2015; Weeks 20 and 22, 2016; Weeks 8, 21 and 25, 2017),  Justin Morrow (Weeks 23 and 30, 2017),  Alejandro Pozuelo (Week 8, 2019),  Richie Laryea (Week 14, 2020) and  Michael Bradley (Week 22, 2022)
 Goal of the Week –  Danny Dichio (Weeks 6, 9 and 29, 2007),  Jim Brennan (Week 8, 2007),  Chad Barrett (Week 20, 2008),  O'Brian White (Week 26, 2009),  Javier Martina (Week 2, 2011),  Ryan Johnson (Week 2, 2012),  Sebastian Giovinco (Week 23, 2015),  Alejandro Pozuelo (Weeks 5 and 8, 2019), Jordan Hamilton (Week 15, 2019),  Richie Laryea (Week 14, 2020) and  Domenico Criscito (Week 26, 2022)
 Save of the Week –  Stefan Frei (Weeks 15, 24, 25, and 26, 2009; Week 15, 2010 and Week 9, 2011),  Amado Guevara (Week 22, 2009),  Miloš Kocić (Week 22, 2011) and  Alex Bono (Weeks 17 and 25, 2017)

Team of the season
MLS All-Star selection -  Ronnie O'Brien (2007),  Jim Brennan (2008),  Dwayne De Rosario (2009 and 2010),  Jermain Defoe (2014),  Michael Bradley (2014, 2015 and 2017),  Sebastian Giovinco (2015, 2016, 2017 and 2018),  Jozy Altidore (2017) and  Alejandro Pozuelo (2019)
Best XI –  Dwayne De Rosario (2009 and 2010),  Sebastian Giovinco (2015, 2016 and 2017),  Víctor Vázquez (2017),  Justin Morrow (2017) and  Alejandro Pozuelo (2019 and 2020)

Individual 
 Rookie of the Year –  Maurice Edu (2007)
 Most Valuable Player –  Sebastian Giovinco (2015) and  Alejandro Pozuelo (2020)
 Golden Boot –  Sebastian Giovinco (2015)
 Newcomer of the Year –  Sebastian Giovinco (2015)
 Coach of the Year –  Greg Vanney (2017)
 MLS Cup Most Valuable Player –  Jozy Altidore (2017)

Canadian Championship
George Gross Memorial Trophy –  Dwayne De Rosario (2009 and 2010),  Joao Plata (2011),  Ryan Johnson (2012),  Benoît Cheyrou (2016),  Sebastian Giovinco (2017) and  Jonathan Osorio (2018)
Best Young Canadian Player Award –  Jacob Shaffelburg (2021)

CONCACAF Champions League
Golden Ball –  Sebastian Giovinco (2018)
Golden Boot –  Jonathan Osorio (2018)
Best XI –  Sebastian Giovinco (2018) and  Jonathan Osorio (2018)

Front office
 Ticket Sales Team of the Year – 2007
 Corporate Partnerships Team of the Year – 2010
 Marketing Executive of the Year – César Velasco (2007)
 Doug Hamilton Executive of the Year – Paul Beirne (2007)
 Team Administrator of the Year – Corey Wray (2010)

Team 
 Most Valuable Player –  Jim Brennan and  Carl Robinson (co-winners) (2007),  Carl Robinson (2008),  Dwayne De Rosario (2009),  Adrian Cann (2010) and  Joao Plata (2011)
 Golden Boot for team top scorer –  Danny Dichio (2007),  Chad Barrett (2008),  Dwayne De Rosario (2009) and  Dwayne De Rosario (2010)
 Defender of the Year –  Jim Brennan (2007),  Marvell Wynne (2008) and  Stefan Frei (2009)
 Humanitarian of the Year –  Chris Pozniak (2007),  Todd Dunivant (2008),  Jim Brennan (2009) and  Stefan Frei (2010)
 Supporters' Player of the Year –  Jim Brennan (2007),  Greg Sutton (U-Sector) and   Carl Robinson (Red Patch Boys) (2008),  Dwayne De Rosario (2009),  Stefan Frei (2010) and  Joao Plata (2011)

References

 
 
  
  
 

Records
Canadian soccer club statistics
Ontario sport-related lists